Wyboston is a village in the English county of Bedfordshire, adjacent to the town of St Neots, on the Cambridgeshire border. The eastern part of the village is dominated by the A1 Great North Road. Approaching the Black Cat Roundabout from the Bedford direction, the parish boundary is in the centre of the A421 road. The northern junction of these roads is grade-separated. The Black Cat Roundabout is therefore partly within Wyboston parish.

Wyboston is in the civil parish of Wyboston, Chawston and Colesden.

The remainder of Wyboston is horticultural and agricultural as a result of the proximity of the River Great Ouse.

Wyboston Lakes Resort at the edge of the village includes a golf course, hotel, spa, serviced offices and conference & training facilities. Wyboston is also the location of a conference centre owned and operated by Cambridge University's Robinson College. The public house Wait for the Waggon has closed down indefinitely. There is a service station which includes a BP garage with a Londis shop attached, Subway and a 24-hour McDonald's.

The Crown Public House has a more ambitious offer, associated with a Premier Inn hotel. The Crown serves full meals as well as having a bar. It is close to the boundary with St Neots (Eaton Socon) and many passers-by will assume it is in that parish.

Wyboston is the location of the Black Cat Roundabout, where the Bedford Road joins the A1 road. In the 1930s the location was the site of a cafe and fuel station, and was a notable stopping point for motorists. The name stuck for the road junction, and when the road system was improved in 2010 a black cat artwork was erected on the roundabout. Notwithstanding some vandalism, the Black Cat stands there today.

References

External links 

Wyboston pages at the Bedfordshire and Luton Archives and Record Service

Villages in Bedfordshire
Borough of Bedford